This is a list of notable meat dishes. Some meat dishes are prepared using two or more types of meat, while others are only prepared using one type. Furthermore, some dishes can be prepared using various types of meats, such as the enchilada, which can be prepared using beef, pork or chicken.

Meat dishes

The following meat dishes are prepared using various types of meats, and some are prepared using two or more types of meat in the dish.
 Anticucho –  popular and inexpensive dishes that originated in the Andes during the pre-Columbian era. While anticuchos can be made of any type of meat, the most popular are made of beef heart (anticuchos de corazón).
 Asocena 
 Baeckeoffe – a French casserole dish prepared using mutton, beef and pork
 Barbacoa
 Berner Platte – a traditional meat dish of Bernese cuisine in Switzerland. It consists of various meat and sausage varieties such as smoked pork and beef, pork belly, sausage, bacon and pork ears or tails cooked with juniper-flavored sauerkraut, and other foods such as potatoes and green beans or dried beans, which are served on a large plate.
 Beşbarmaq 
 Birria 

 Bobotie – a South African dish consisting of spiced minced meat baked with an egg-based topping.
 Boliche 
 Bosintang – a Korean soup that includes dog meat as its primary ingredient.
 Braciola 
 Breaded cutlet – a dish made from coating a cutlet of meat with breading or batter and either frying or baking it.
 Brunswick stew 
 Burgoo –  a spicy stew that originated in the U.S. state of Kentucky, it is also referred to as "roadkill soup". It can be prepared using pork, chicken or mutton.
 Cabeza guateada – a traditional earth oven dish from Argentina made with the head of a cow and condiments.
 Capuns 
 Carimañola 
 Carne a la tampiqueña 
 Carne pinchada – a Nicaraguan dish consisting of meat (such as beef or chicken) marinated in an alcohol sauce, using beer (Tona or Victoria) or wine.
 Carne pizzaiola 
 Carpaccio
 Chiles en nogada 
 Chislic 
 Chunla 
 Churrasco 
 Çiğ köfte
 City chicken 
 Cockentrice – a dish consisting of a suckling pig's upper body sewn onto the bottom half of a capon or turkey. Alternately, the front end (head and torso) of the poultry is sewn to the rump of the piglet. The dish originates from the Middle Ages and at least one source attributes the Tudor dynasty of the Kingdom of England as its originator.
 Compote – a game meat dish
 Curanto
 Discada – a mixed meat dish popular in northern Mexican states, it includes a mixture of grilled meats cooked on an agricultural plow disk harrow, hence its name.
 Durus kura — a whole chicken roast 
 Enchilada
 Escalope – boneless meat that has been thinned out using a mallet, rolling pin or beaten with the handle of a knife, or merely butterflied. The mallet breaks down the fibers in the meat, making it more tender, while the thinner meat cooks faster with less moisture loss. The meat is then coated and fried.
 Farsu magru – a traditional meat roll dish in Sicilian cuisine that dates to the 13th century prepared using beef or veal.
 Fatányéros 
 Finnbiff 
 Flurgönder 

 Fricassee – a method of cooking meat in which it is cut up, sautéed and braised, and served with its sauce, traditionally a white sauce.  Fricassee can also refer to a type of sandwich made in Tunisia with fried bread and typically filled with many ingredients including tuna, olives, hard-boiled egg, middle eastern tomato salad, and others.
 Frigărui 
 Giouvetsi 
 Güveç 
 Guyanese pepperpot – A Guyanese dish prepared using meats such as beef, pork and mutton
 Gyro 
 Hachee 
 Haggis 
 Hodge-Podge – a meat soup
 Inihaw
 Jerusalem mixed grill – a grilled meat dish considered a specialty of Jerusalem. It consists of chicken hearts, spleens and liver mixed with bits of lamb cooked on a flat grill, seasoned with onion, garlic, black pepper, cumin, turmeric, olive oil and coriander.
 Jugging – the process of stewing whole animals, mainly game or fish, for an extended period in a tightly covered container such as a casserole or an earthenware jug
 Kaalilaatikko 
 Kachilaa

 Kelaguen
 Khorovats 
 Kibbeh nayyeh – a Levantine mezze consisting of minced raw lamb or raw beef mixed with fine bulgur and spices.
 Kielbasa
 Kiviak 
 Kohlwurst 
 Koi
 Korean barbecue – refers to the Korean method of roasting meat, typically beef, pork, or chicken. Such dishes are often prepared at diner table on gas or charcoal grills, built into the table itself.
 Kutti pi 

 Larb – a type of Lao meat salad most often made with chicken, beef, duck, fish, pork or mushrooms
 Laurices 
 Lawar 
 Lihapiirakka 
 Lomo a lo pobre –  in Peruvian cuisine, consists of a cut of beef tenderloin (Spanish lomo) topped with one or more fried eggs and generally served with French fries and fried onions.
 Lörtsy 
 Maksalaatikko – a Finnish liver casserole that is traditionally eaten on Christmas
 À la Maréchale – a method of food preparation in haute cuisine, dishes à la Maréchale are made from tender pieces of meat, such as cutlets, escalopes, supremes, sweetbreads, or fish, which are treated à l'anglais ("English-style"), i.e. coated with eggs and bread crumbs, and sautéed.
 Meatcake 
 Menchi-katsu 
 Mett
 Mikoyan cutlet – was a Soviet semi-processed ground meat cutlet variety on the basis of American hamburger beef patty, nicknamed after Soviet politician Anastas Mikoyan. In 1964, The New York Times reported that the Mikoyan cutlet was "the cheapest, most popular if not most revered piece of meat a few kopecks can buy".
 Mixed grill

 Mixiote – a traditional pit-barbecued meat dish in central Mexico; especially in the Basin of Mexico. It can also be prepared in an oven. It is usually made with mutton or rabbit, but chicken, lamb, and pork are also used. 
 Mykyrokka 
 Naryn 
 Nem nguội 
 Pachamanca 
 Pachola 
 Pamplona – a grilled stuffed-meat dish from Uruguay prepared with chicken, and may be prepared with other meats such as pork and beef.
 Pastramă – a popular delicatessen meat traditionally in Romania made from lamb and also from pork and mutton
 Peremech
 Pljeskavica
 Po
 Poc Chuc 
 Poronkäristys 

 Potjevleesch – a traditional French Flemish dish, which can be translated into English as "potted meat", it is prepared using three or four different types of meat and held together either with gelatin or natural fats coming from the meats used. 
 Poume d'oranges 
 Pringá 
 Pukala 
 Pyttipanna 
 Qingtang wanzi 
 Rat-on-a-stick – a dish or snack consisting of a roasted rat served on a stick or skewer that is consumed in Thailand and Vietnam. Prior to roasting, the rat is typically skinned and washed, after which it is gutted to remove its internal organs and then roasted.
 Ražnjići 
 Renskav 
 Riz gras 
 Rundstück warm
 Sanjeok 

 Sapu Mhicha – a specialty of the Newari cuisine of the Kathmandu Valley that is prepared during special occasions, it consists of buffalo leaf tripe stuffed with bone marrow that is boiled and fried.
 Saramură 
 Sate kambing – the Indonesian name for "mutton satay"
 Satti 
 Sauerbraten 
 Sautéed reindeer 
 Schäufele 

 Schlachteplatte – a hearty German mixed grill dish that primarily consists of boiled pork belly (Kesselfleisch) and freshly cooked Blutwurst and Leberwurst sausages. The cooking process produces sausage juices which, together with any split sausages, are used as a soup known as Metzelsuppe. As a result, in many places, e.g. in parts of the Palatinate, the entire festival and the meal in particular, is known as metzelsupp.
 Seco 
 Seswaa – a traditional meat dish of Botswana made of beef and goat meat
 Shaokao
 Shish kebab
 Shuizhu 
 Smokie – a West African dish prepared by blowtorching the fleece off the unskinned carcass of an old sheep or goat.
 Souvlaki 
 Speckkuchen 
 Ssam 
 Stew peas 
 Suanla chaoshou – a dish in Sichuan cuisine that consists of a spicy sauce over steamed, meat-filled dumplings
 Surf and turf 
 Swan Puka 
 Tataki
 Teste de Turke 
 Toad in the hole – a traditional English dish consisting of sausages in Yorkshire pudding batter, usually served with onion gravy and vegetables. Historically, the dish has also been prepared using other meats, such as rump steak and lamb's kidney.
 Turducken
 Tushonka – a canned stewed meat especially popular in Russia and other countries of the former Eastern Bloc
 Wurstsalat – a German sausage salad
 Xab Momo 
 Yakiniku 
 Zoervleis – a regional meat dish from the Province of Limburg, a region split between Limburg (Netherlands) and Limburg (Belgium), that is typically prepared using horse meat.

By type

Beef

Fish

Goat

Lamb and mutton

Meatball

Pork

Poultry

Sausage

Seafood

See also

 Meat dishes by country (Category page)
 Barbecue restaurant
 List of barbecue dishes
 List of domesticated meat animals
 Lists of foods
 List of kebabs
 List of smoked foods
 List of spit-roasted foods
 Mystery meat
 Patty 
 Regional variations of barbecue

References

External links
 

 
Lists of foods by ingredient